José Vicente Grecco  (20 June 1929 in Bahía Blanca – 24 August 2008 in Medellín) was an Argentine football player and manager.

Club career
Grecco began his playing career in 1948 with Boca Juniors, he only played one game for the club a 3–1 defeat to Estudiantes de La Plata on 14 November 1948. He then went on to play for Unión de Santa Fe and Newell's Old Boys in the Primera División Argentina. Grecco scored 55 goals in 107 matches for Unión.

He also enjoyed success in Colombia with Independiente Medellín and Santa Fe. Grecco is Independiente Medellín's all-time leading goal scorer with 92 goals in 166 games, and he was the top goal scorer in the 1957 Fútbol Profesional Colombiano with 30 goals.

Personal
Grecco died 24 August 2008 in Medellín.

References

1929 births
2008 deaths
Argentine footballers
Argentine football managers
Boca Juniors footballers
Unión de Santa Fe footballers
Newell's Old Boys footballers
Club Atlético River Plate (Montevideo) players
Independiente Medellín footballers
Independiente Santa Fe footballers
Málaga CF players
Real Murcia players
Independiente Medellín managers
Argentine Primera División players
Categoría Primera A players
Argentine expatriate footballers
Expatriate footballers in Colombia
Expatriate footballers in Uruguay
Expatriate footballers in Italy
Expatriate footballers in Spain
Argentine expatriate sportspeople in Colombia
Argentine expatriate sportspeople in Uruguay
Argentine expatriate sportspeople in Italy
Argentine expatriate sportspeople in Spain
Association football forwards
Sportspeople from Bahía Blanca